High Seas Havoc, known in Japan as  and in Europe as Capt'n Havoc, is a video game that was made for the Sega Mega Drive/Genesis by Data East. It was also released in the arcades running on a Sega Mega Drive/Genesis based arcade cabinet.

Plot
The story is about an anthropomorphic pirate seal named Havoc (Lang in the Japanese version), his young sidekick Tide (Land in the Japanese version), a girl named Bridget, and an evil walrus pirate named Bernardo. Bernardo is looking for Emeralda, a gem with powers that can cause whole armies to be toppled. A map shows where Emeralda is located, and Bernardo is looking for the map. Havoc and Tide discover Bridget unconscious at a beach. When she wakes up in a dwelling, she instructs Havoc to keep her and the map safe. Havoc hides the map in a cliff. After Bernardo's henchmen kidnaps Bridget and Tide, Havoc sets off to rescue them.

Gameplay
Each level apart from the first two and last one have two acts. The Cape Sealph level was removed from the European version.

Development

Reception

High Seas Havoc received generally positive reviews.

Tony Ponce for Destructoid called the game a rip-off of Sonic the Hedgehog.

References

External links
 Mainichi Interactive page on Captain Lang

Fictional pirates
Fictional pinnipeds
1993 video games
Sega Genesis games
Arcade video games
Data East video games
Video games developed in Japan
Video games about pirates
Data East arcade games